Sir Henry Hicks Hocking (16 July 1842 – 9 June 1907) was a British colonial administrator.

Biography 
He was born the son of Richard Hocking, a merchant of Kennington, Surrey and educated at St John's College, Oxford, where he graduated BA in 1864 and BCL in 1867. He entered the Inner Temple to study law and was called to the bar in 1867.

After some years in practice in England Hocking went out to Western Australia where he served as Attorney-General of Western Australia from 1872 to 1879, excepting a period in 1874/5 when he was acting Chief Justice in the absence of Archibald Burt. In 1879/80 he was acting Chief Justice of Gibraltar.

From 1881 to 1896 he was the Attorney General of Jamaica. He was knighted in 1895.

He died in London in 1907. He had married Elizabeth Mary Pittis, the daughter of Edward Arnold.

References

1842 births
1907 deaths
People from Kennington
Alumni of St John's College, Oxford
Members of the Inner Temple
Attorneys-General of Western Australia
Attorneys General of Jamaica
Knights Bachelor
19th-century Australian politicians